Gastrotheca chrysosticta is a species of frog in the family Hemiphractidae.
It is found in Argentina and Bolivia.
Its natural habitat is subtropical or tropical moist lowland forests.
It is threatened by habitat loss.

References

chrysosticta
Frogs of South America
Amphibians of Argentina
Amphibians of Bolivia
Taxonomy articles created by Polbot
Amphibians described in 1976